Beryl Leon Clark (October 13, 1917 – January 15, 2000) was an American football player.  

Clark was born in Cherokee, Oklahoma, in 1917, an attended Cherokee High School.

He played college football for the Oklahoma Sooners football team from 1936 to 1939. As a senior in 1939, he completed 40 of 66 passes for a 60.6% completion rate. His completion percentage was the highest in the county. He also led the Sooners with 680 yards from scrimmage. He also led the Big Six Conference with 50 points scored (eight touchdowns and two extra points). He was selected by both the conference coaches and the Associated Press as a first-team back on their respective 1939 All-Big Six Conference football teams.  He was also selected by the International News Service as a second-team halfback on the 1939 College Football All-America Team.

He was drafted by the Chicago Cardinals with the 141st pick in the 1940 NFL Draft and played for the Cardinals during the 1940 NFL season. He appeared in 10 games for the Cardinals, completed 25 passes for 316 yards and two touchdowns and kicked three extra points. 

During World War II, Clark served as a pilot in the Air Transport Command, "flying the hump" between Burma and China.

Clark died in 2000 at age 82 in Cherokee, Oklahoma.

References 

1917 births
2000 deaths
American football halfbacks
Oklahoma Sooners football players
Chicago Cardinals players
Players of American football from Oklahoma
People from Alfalfa County, Oklahoma